Carlo Maria Bascapè (25 October 1550 – 6 October 1615) - born Giovanni Francesco Bascapè - was an Italian Roman Catholic prelate who served as Bishop of Novara from 1593 until his death. He was a close friend of Saint Charles Borromeo and assumed the first half of his religious name in honor of him.

Bascapè became titled as Venerable on 19 December 2005 - on the road to possible sainthood - after Pope Benedict XVI confirmed his heroic virtue.

Life
Carlo Bascapè was born in Milan on 25 October 1550 to the nobles Angelo Bascapè and Isabella Giussani.

He moved to Pavia in 1568 for his studies at the college there in law and he graduated with a doctorate in both civil and canon law in 1574. Bascapè received the minor orders in spring 1575.

He was ordained to the priesthood on 29 July 1576 and became a professed member of the Clerics Regular of Saint Paul after joining them in March 1578. His solemn profession into the order on 8 May 1579 saw him assume the religious name of "Carlo Maria". He had assumed the first half of his name in honor of Saint Charles Borromeo whom he admired and respected. He served as the Superior General for the Barnabites from 8 May 1586 until 8 February 1593. At some stage between 1589 and 1590 he met with Pope Gregory XIV. He promoted the sainthood cause for Charles Borromeo and was present on 1 November 1610 when Pope Paul V canonized him as a saint. He was also present on 12 May 1602 previously when the same pope previously had beatified him.

Pope Clement VIII - on 8 February 1593 appointed him as the Bishop of Novara. He received his episcopal consecration that same month on 24 February from Ludovico de Torres with Francesco Gonzaga and Owen Lewis serving as the co-consecrators; he was installed in his new diocese the following 30 May and worked his hardest to implement the reforms of the Council of Trent. He served as bishop in his episcopal see until his death from a long illness on 6 October 1615. His remains were later relocated in 1801.

Beatification cause

The process for beatification opened in Novara under Bishop Placidio Maria Cambiaghi who opened the informative process on 10 May 1966 while his successor Bishop Aldo De Monte closed the process at a special Mass on 4 December 1976. His spiritual writings were all approved on 12 March 1982 and the Congregation for the Causes of Saints validated the informative process on 12 April 2002 while also receiving the Positio in 2003.

Historians assented to the cause on 20 May 2003 as did the theologians on 9 March 2004 as well as the C.C.S. members on 18 January 2005. He was proclaimed to be Venerable on 19 December 2005 after Pope Benedict XVI confirmed that he had lived a life of heroic virtue.

The current postulator assigned to the cause is the Barnabite priest Mauro Domenico Regazzoni.

References

External links
Hagiography Circle
Catholic Hierarchy

1550 births
1615 deaths
People from Melegnano
16th-century Italian Roman Catholic bishops
16th-century venerated Christians
17th-century Italian Roman Catholic bishops
17th-century venerated Christians
Bishops appointed by Pope Clement VIII
Barnabite bishops
University of Pavia alumni
Venerated Catholics by Pope Benedict XVI